Plekocheilus is a genus of air-breathing land snails, terrestrial pulmonate gastropod mollusks in the family Amphibulimidae.

Distribution 
This genus occurs in South America: Colombia, Venezuela, Brazil and Ecuador.

Species 
Species within the genus Plekocheilus include:
 
 Plekocheilus alticolus (F. Haas, 1955)
 Plekocheilus ampullaroides (Mousson, 1873)
 Plekocheilus annetae Breure, 2020
 Plekocheilus apunni (Dunker, 1875)
 Plekocheilus argenteus (Jousseaume, 1900)
 Plekocheilus aristaceus (Crosse, 1869)
 Plekocheilus aulacostylus (L. Pfeiffer, 1853)
 Plekocheilus aureonitens (K. Miller, 1878)
 Plekocheilus auriformis (da Costa, 1904)
 Plekocheilus aurissciuri Guppy, 1866
 Plekocheilus aurissileni (Born, 1780) - photo of radula
 Plekocheilus bellulus (Jonas, 1844)
 Plekocheilus bigener Borrero & Breure, 2011
 Plekocheilus blainvilleanus (Pfeiffer, 1848)
 Plekocheilus breweri Breure & Schlögl, 2010
 Plekocheilus bruggeni Breure, 1978
 Plekocheilus calliostomus (Dohrn, 1882)
 Plekocheilus camaritagua Borrero & Breure, 2011
 Plekocheilus cardinalis (Pfeiffer, 1853)
 Plekocheilus castaneus (Pfeiffer, 1845)
 Plekocheilus cathcartiae (Reeve, 1848)
 Plekocheilus cecepeus Breure & R. Araujo, 2015
 Plekocheilus coloratus (Nyst, 1845) - synonym: Plekocheilus lamarckianus (Pfeiffer, 1848)
 Plekocheilus conspicuus Pilsbry, 1932
 Plekocheilus dalmasi (Dautzenberg, 1900)
 Plekocheilus delicatus (Pilsbry, 1935)
 Plekocheilus dillwynianus (Pfeiffer, 1853)
 Plekocheilus dissimulans (Preston, 1909)
 Plekocheilus distortus (Bruguière, 1789) - in Brazil and Venezuela 
 Plekocheilus doliarius (da Costa, 1898)
 Plekocheilus elaeodes (L. Pfeiffer, 1853)
 Plekocheilus episcopalis (Pfeiffer, 1855)
 subspecies Plekocheilus episcopalis auriformis (Da Costa, 1904) - synonym: Plekocheilus auriformis (da Costa, 1904)
 subspecies Plekocheilus episcopalis corticosus (Sowerby III, 1895)
 Plekocheilus eros (Angas, 1878)
 Plekocheilus euryomphalus (Jonas, 1844) - synonym: Plekocheilus otostomus (Pfeiffer, 1855), - in Venezuela
 Plekocheilus floccosus (Spix in J. A. Wagner, 1827)
 Plekocheilus fulminans (Nyst, 1843)
 Plekocheilus fusitorsus (Oberwimmer, 1931)
 Plekocheilus gibber (Oberwimmer, 1931)
 Plekocheilus gibbonius (Lea, 1838)
 Plekocheilus glaber (Gmelin, 1791)
 Plekocheilus glandiformis (Lea, 1838) - synonym: Plekocheilus (Eurytus) couturesi Ancey, 1900
 Plekocheilus guentheri (G.B. Sowerby III, 1892)
 Plekocheilus hauxwelli (Crosse, 1872)
 Plekocheilus huberi Breure, 2009
 Plekocheilus incognitus Borrero & Breure, 2011
 Plekocheilus jimenezi (Hidalgo, 1872)
 Plekocheilus jucundus (L. Pfeiffer, 1855)
 Plekocheilus labiosus Borrero & Breure, 2011
 Plekocheilus lacerta (Pfeiffer, 1855)
 Plekocheilus linterae(G.B. Sowerby III, 1890)
 Plekocheilus loveni (Pfeiffer, 1848)
 Plekocheilus lugubris (Dunker, 1882)
 Plekocheilus lynciculus (Deville & Hupé, 1850)
 Plekocheilus midas (Albers, 1852)
 Plekocheilus mundiperditi F. Haas, 1955
 Plekocheilus nachiyacu Pilsbry, 1939
 Plekocheilus nebulosus Breure, 2009
 Plekocheilus nocturnus Pilsbry, 1939
 Plekocheilus oligostylus Pilsbry, 1939
 Plekocheilus onca (d'Orbigny, 1835)
 Plekocheilus paraguas Borrero & Breure, 2011
 Plekocheilus pentadinus (d’Orbigny, 1835) - synonym: Helix onca d’Orbigny, 1835
 Plekocheilus perdix (Pfeiffer, 1848)
 Plekocheilus philippei Breure, 2012 in press
 Plekocheilus piperatoides Pilsbry, 1901
 Plekocheilus piperitus (G.B.Sowerby I, 1837)
 Plekocheilus pirriensis Dall, 1912
 Plekocheilus plectostylus (Pfeiffer, 1848) - synonym: Plekocheilus speciosus (Pfeiffer, 1854)
 Plekocheilus pulicarius (Reeve, 1848) - synonyms: Plekocheilus (Eurytus) virgatus (Pilsbry, 1935); Plekocheilus (Eurytus) mabillei (Crosse, 1867)
 Plekocheilus quadricolor (Pfeiffer, 1848)
 Plekocheilus rhodocheilus (Reeve, 1848)
 Plekocheilus roseolabrum (E. A. Smith, 1877)
 Plekocheilus sanderi Breure, 2020
 Plekocheilus semperi (Dohrn, 1882)
 Plekocheilus sinuatus (Albers, 1854)
 Plekocheilus sophiae Breure, 2009
 Plekocheilus subglandiformis (Mousson, 1873)
 Plekocheilus succineoides (Petit de la Saussaye, 1840) - synonym: Plekocheilus latilabris (Pfeiffer, 1855)
 subspecies Plekocheilus succineoides cleeforum Breure, 1977
 subspecies Plekocheilus succineoides zilchi Breure, 1977
 Plekocheilus superstriatus (G.B. Sowerby III, 1890)
 Plekocheilus taquinensis (Pfeiffer, 1855)
 Plekocheilus tatei (F. Haas, 1955)
 Plekocheilus taylorianus (Reeve, 1849)
 Plekocheilus tenuissimus Weyrauch, 1967
 Plekocheilus tetensii (Dunker, 1875)
 Plekocheilus tricolor (Pfeiffer, 1853)
 Plekocheilus taylorianus (Reeve, 1849)
 Plekocheilus veranyi (Pfeiffer, 1848) - synonym: Bulimus scytodes Pfeiffer, 1853
 Plekocheilus vlceki Breure & Schlögl, 2010

Synonyms
 Plekocheilus ameghinoi Parodiz, 1962: synonym of Plekocheilus guentheri (G. B. Sowerby III, 1892) (junior synonym)
 Plekocheilus gracilis Broderip, 1841: synonym of Callistocharis fulguratus (Jay, 1842) (invalid: junior secondary homonym of Bulimus gracilis Hutton, 1834)
 Plekocheilus jacksoni Pilsbry, 1939: synonym of Plekocheilus lynciculus (Deville & Hupé, 1850) (junior synonymy)
 Plekocheilus manco Pilsbry, 1930: synonym of Plekocheilus veranyi (L. Pfeiffer, 1848) (junior synonymy)
 Plekocheilus mcgintyi H. B. Baker, 1963: synonym of Plekocheilus piperitus mcgintyi H. B. Baker, 1963 (original combination)
 Plekocheilus pseudopiperatus Pilsbry, 1895: synonym of Plekocheilus piperitus piperitus (G. B. Sowerby I, 1837) (junior synonym)
 Plekocheilus undulatus (Leach, 1814): synonym of Plekocheilus aurissileni (Born, 1780)

References

 Oberwimmer, H. (1931). Beschreibung dreier neuer Bulimuliden aus dem Senckenberg-Museum. Senckenbergiana, 13: 190-194. Frankfurt am Main.
 Weyrauch, W.K. (1967). Descripciones y notas sobre gastropodos terrestres de Venezuela, Colombia, Ecuador, Brasil, y Peru. Acta Zoológica Lilloana, 21: 457-499.

Further reading 
 Breure A. S. H. (1975). "Caribbean land molluscs: Bulimulidae, II. Plekocheilus and Naesiotus". Studies on the Fauna of Curaçao and other Caribbean Islands 46: 71-93, pls. 6-8, tables 8-14.

External links 
 Swainson W. (1829-1833). Zoological Illustrations, or original figures and descriptions of new, rare, or interesting animals, selected chiefly from the classes of ornithology, entomology, and conchology, and arranged according to their apparent affinities. Second series. London: Baldwin & Cradock
 Agassiz, L. (1846). Nomenclatoris Zoologici Index Universalis, continens nomina systematica classium, ordinum, familiarum et generum animalium omnium, tam viventium quam fossilium, secundum ordinem alphabeticum unicum disposita, adjectis homonymus plantarum nec non variis adnotationibus et emendationibus. i-x, 1-1135. Soloduri. : Sumptibus Jent et Gassman
 Albers, J. C. (1850). Die Heliceen nach natürlicher Verwandtschaft systematisch geordnet. Berlin: Enslin. 262 pp.
 Guilding, I. (1828). Observations on the zoology of the Caribbean Islands. The Zoological Journal. 3: 527-544
 Pilsbry, H. A. (1895-1896). Manual of conchology, structural and systematic, with illustrations of the species. Ser. 2, Pulmonata. Vol. 10: American Bulimi and Bulimuli. Streptocheilus, Plekocheilus, Auris, Bulimulus. pp i-iv, 1-213, pls 1-51. Philadelphia, published by the Conchological Section, Academy of Natural Sciences
 Breure, A. S. H. (1975). Caribbean land molluscs: Bulimulidae II. Plekocheilus and Naesiotus. Studies on the Fauna of Curaçao and other Caribbean Islands: no. 152. 71-93, pls. 6-8.
 Breure, A. S. H. & Araujo, R. (2017). The Neotropical land snails (Mollusca, Gastropoda) collected by the “Comisión Científica del Pacífico.”. PeerJ. 5, e3065

7

Amphibulimidae